Henry Samuel Chapman (21 July 1803 – 27 December 1881) was an Australian and New Zealand judge, colonial secretary, attorney-general, journalist and politician.

Early life
Chapman was born at Kennington, London, the son of Henry Chapman, English civil servant, and his wife Ann, daughter of Rev. Thomas Hart Davies. Chapman was educated privately at Bromley, Kent.
In 1818, he entered a bank, then in 1823 emigrated to Quebec, Canada where he went into business as a commission merchant. In 1833 he started the first Canadian daily newspapers, the radical Montreal Daily Advertiser, in association with Samuel Revans.

In 1835, Chapman returned to England as a salaried intermediary between the Legislative Assembly of Lower Canada and its friends in the House of Commons of the United Kingdom. Chapman remained in England for some time and took up the study of law, being admitted to the bar of the Middle Temple in 1840. Five years earlier he had published The Act for the Regulation of Municipal Corporations . . . with a complete index and notes.  He was also involved in journalism and various Liberal reform movements e.g. the anti-corn law agitations. He served on several Royal Commissions on industry, e.g. on the Yorkshire wool industry, and contributed to reviews and to the seventh edition of the Encyclopædia Britannica.

New Zealand and Australia
Chapman founded the New Zealand Journal, which he edited and published in London from 1840 to 1843; he also published the New Zealand Portfolio. He supported the colonising ideas of Edward Gibbon Wakefield, and had a passion for colonial self-government, on which he published several treatises. In 1843 he published the New Zealand Portfolio, Papers on Subjects of Importance to the Colonists, and was appointed a judge of the Supreme Court of New Zealand. He was stationed at Wellington, residing at Karori. The size of the district meant covering such distances as Kawhia to New Plymouth and New Plymouth to Wellington on foot. But he was under the Chief Justice William Martin and, according to Charlotte Godley, always "considered himself too good for his present position". During this time Chapman gave what has become an influential judgment on native title in R v Symonds (1847). So in 1852 he accepted a position in Van Diemen's Land (Tasmania).

Chapman went to Van Diemen's Land as Colonial Secretary in 1852, arriving in April. Later that year, as a nominee member of the council, left the chamber when a vote on the transportation question was being taken. Governor Denison held that as a representative of the government in the legislative council Chapman should have supported its transportation policy and virtually dismissed him, though he gave him leave of absence on half pay until the question could be referred to the Secretary of State. The governor's action was confirmed and Chapman went to Melbourne in 1854 and practised as a barrister. On 13 February 1855 he was elected a member of the Victorian Legislative Council for South Bourke, Evelyn and Mornington, and early in 1856 drafted the bill which brought in the ballot system of secret voting, afterwards known as the 'Australian' or 'Victorian' system and adopted by other countries all over the world. The Australian Encyclopaedia, entry under "ballot", points out that it became law in Victoria on 19 March 1856 and in South Australia on 2 April 1856; though the South Australian proposals had been made first. In Victoria there were very vague ideas about the working of a secret system of voting. Chapman's special contribution was that he devised a method that was workable, and drafted the first bill to become law in any part of the world. Under it the voter struck out the name of any candidate he did not desire to be elected, and this procedure was followed in Victoria until federation came in. Though without a seat in parliament, he had been defeated at an election at St Kilda, Chapman was Attorney-General in the first O'Shanassy ministry for a few weeks in 1857, and securing the St Kilda seat in December, in the following March was asked to form a ministry. This was done with O'Shanassy as premier and Chapman as attorney-general. This government resigned on 27 October 1859. In 1860 Chapman was a lecturer in law at the University of Melbourne. In 1861 he was elected to the Victorian Legislative Assembly for Mornington. He resigned his seat in February 1862 to become an acting-judge of the Supreme Court of Victoria, while Redmond Barry took a year's leave of absence.

In March 1864, Chapman was appointed a judge of the Supreme Court of New Zealand, at Dunedin.
He was involved there with the University of Otago and the Otago Institute.
Chapman retired in 1875 taking up commerce and sheep farming in Central Otago, he died of cancer in Dunedin, New Zealand.
He had an obituary notice in The Times.

Family
Chapman married twice; firstly on 6 June 1840, to Catherine DeLancy Brewer (born 1810), (daughter of T. G. Brewer, a London barrister), who was drowned while returning to Australia from visiting England along with two sons and a daughter when the passenger ship SS London foundered in the Bay of Biscay in January 1866. They had seven children together, six sons and a daughter.

Chapman revisited England, and on 11 April 1868 married Selina Frances Carr, sister-in-law of Richard Davies Ireland, who survived him, with at least three sons of the first marriage. His third son, Martin Chapman, was amongst the first seven King's Counsel to be appointed in New Zealand in 1907. His fifth son, Sir Frederick Revans Chapman, became a Supreme Court judge in New Zealand, and President of the Court of Arbitration.

References

Further reading
 
 

1803 births
1881 deaths
Judges of the Supreme Court of Victoria
Colonial Secretaries of Tasmania
New Zealand farmers
Members of the Victorian Legislative Assembly
Members of the Victorian Legislative Council
High Court of New Zealand judges
Aboriginal title in New Zealand
Burials at Dunedin Northern Cemetery
Attorneys-General of the Colony of Victoria
Academic staff of the University of Melbourne
People from Kennington
English emigrants to Australia
Colony of New Zealand judges
19th-century Australian politicians
Chancellors of the University of Otago